The Lauchsee is a large moor lake, 2.3 hectares in area, in the Tyrolean district of Kitzbühel. The lake has two small islands and its maximum depth is 4.3 metres.
There is a swimming baths on the Lauchsee called the Moorbad Lauchsee.

External links 
 Water quality report at  www.tirol.gv.at 

Lakes of Tyrol (state)
Kitzbühel District
Kitzbühel Alps
LLauchsee